Pharmaceutical care is the direct, responsible provision 
of medication-related care for the purpose of achieving definite outcomes that improve a patient’s quality of life.

Definition
Hepler and Linda Strand's definition is the most well-known definition for pharmaceutical care, coming from their article ‘Opportunities and responsibilities in pharmaceutical care’ from 1990. This was a landmark paper because it marked the start of the international movement to make pharmaceutical care more visible, and get the term and the type of care implemented in hospital and community pharmacy practice. During the following years both authors worked to make the concept applicable in practice

Another definition reads:  Pharmaceutical care is the direct or indirect responsible provision of drug therapy for the purpose of achieving the elimination or reduction of a patient's symptoms; arresting or slowing of a disease process; or preventing a disease.

In 2013, a European organization, the Pharmaceutical Care Network Europe (PCNE), created a new definition that could satisfy experts from a multitude of countries. After a review of existing definitions, a number of options were presented to the participants and in a one-day meeting consensus on a definition was reached: Pharmaceutical Care is the pharmacologist/pharmacist's contribution to the care of individuals in order to optimize medicines use and improve health outcomes.

Goal
The ultimate goal of pharmaceutical care (optimize medicines use and improving health outcomes) exists in all practice settings and in all cultures where medicines are used. It involves two major functions: identifying potential and manifest problems in the pharmacotherapy (DRPs), and then resolving the problems and preventing the potential problems from becoming real for the patient and his therapy outcomes. This should preferably be done together with other health care professionals and the patient through a review of the medication (and diseases) and subsequent counselling and discussions.

See also 
 ATC codes Anatomical Therapeutic Chemical Classification System
 Classification of Pharmaco-Therapeutic Referrals
 History of pharmacy
 ICD-10 International Classification of Diseases
 ICPC-2 PLUS
 International Classification of Primary Care ICPC-2
 Pharmacists
 Pharmacotherapy
 Referral (medicine)
 Drug Therapy Problems

References

Bibliography 
 Robert J. Cipolle, Linda M. Strand, Peter C. Morley. Pharmaceutical Care Practice: The Patient-Centered Approach to Medication Management Services.  McGraw-Hill 2012.
 Álvarez de Toledo F, et al. Atención farmacéutica en personas que han sufrido episodios coronarios agudos (Estudio TOMCOR). Rev Esp Salud Pública. 2001; 75:375-88.
 Pastor Sánchez R, Alberola Gómez-Escolar C, Álvarez de Toledo Saavedra F, Fernández de Cano Martín N, Solá Uthurry N. Classification of Pharmaco-Terapeutic Referrals (CPR). MEDAFAR. Madrid: IMC; 2008.
 Álvarez de Toledo Saavedra F, Fernández de Cano Martín N,  coordinadores. MEDAFAR Asma. Madrid: IMC; 2007.
 Álvarez de Toledo Saavedra F, Fernández de Cano Martín N, coordinadores. MEDAFAR Hipertensión. Madrid: IMC; 2007.

External links 
 Fundación Pharmaceutical Care España
 Pharmaceutical Care - Facebook Page

Pharmacy